Donald Macdonell (1862 – 26 October 1911) was a politician, trade unionist and shearer in New South Wales, Australia.

Born at Stuart Mill near St Arnaud, Victoria, to Christina  McMaster and Alexander Macdonell, a Scottish-born farmer and shearer. He helped on his father's farm as a child and moved to New South Wales in 1886, being an early member of the Australian Shearers' Union. He played a leading party in the 1891 strike, during which time he had traveled to Queensland. He became secretary of the Shearers' Union's Bourke branch and a member of the Labor Party in 1894, and helped to draft the rules for the new Australian Workers' Union when the shearers' and labourers' unions amalgamated in the same year. He continued as secretary of the AWU's Bourke branch thereafter. He was general secretary of the AWU from 1900 to 1911.

In 1901 he was elected to the New South Wales Legislative Assembly as the Labor member for Cobar, serving until 1911. He was Minister for Agriculture and Chief Secretary in the McGowen ministry from 1910 to 1911. He was absent from parliament from 1 March 1911 due to illness but was expected to recover when a political crisis caused by the resignation of 2 Labor members resulted in parliament being prorogued and he was automatically expelled for non-attendance during an entire session. He was re-elected unopposed in the Cobar by-election on 7 October, but died three weeks later.

He was a friend of Henry Lawson who in 1899 described Macdonell as "the tallest, straightest, and perhaps the best of the Bourke-side bush-leaders".

References

 

1862 births
1911 deaths
Members of the New South Wales Legislative Assembly
People from Victoria (Australia)
Australian trade unionists
Australian Labor Party members of the Parliament of New South Wales
Australian people of Scottish descent